Ffynnon-ddrain (Sir Gaerfyrddin) is a settlement in 
the county of Dyfed, Wales, one mile north-west of the town of Carmarthen, 24 miles north-west of the major city of Swansea, 56 miles north-west of Cardiff, and 182 miles west of London. 

Ffynnon-ddrain was historically in the county of Carmarthenshire. It is situated nearby to Cwmoernant and Quarry Cottage. 

The village is home to Elim Welsh Independent Chapel.

See also
Carmel, Gwynedd
Llandeilo
Llangathen

References

Villages in Carmarthenshire